Eric Akogyiram (born 25 June 1969) is a retired Ghanaian sprinter who specialized in the 100 metres.

He won the silver medal at the 1987 All-Africa Games. The same year he competed at the 1987 World Championships, reaching the semi-final with the relay team. He also competed at the 1992 Olympic Games.

His personal best time was 10.23 seconds, achieved in April 1990 in Provo.

Achievements

References

External links

1969 births
Living people
Ghanaian male sprinters
Athletes (track and field) at the 1988 Summer Olympics
Athletes (track and field) at the 1992 Summer Olympics
Olympic athletes of Ghana
African Games silver medalists for Ghana
African Games medalists in athletics (track and field)
Athletes (track and field) at the 1987 All-Africa Games